Joseph Patrick Jones (born 4 March 1955) is a Welsh former international football full-back who most notably played for Liverpool, with whom he won two European Cups.

Club career

Wrexham
Jones was born in Llandudno, and joined Wrexham in 1971. He made his debut at the age of 17 in a Welsh Cup tie against local rivals Chester City; Wrexham lost 1–0. He did, however, win the Welsh Cup with the club in 1975, when they beat Cardiff City in the final. Jones established himself as a right-back and helped Wrexham to the quarter-finals of the FA Cup in 1974, the first time the club had reached that stage.

Liverpool
Jones left Wrexham to join his boyhood heroes, Liverpool (he had a Liverbird tattoo, which he later had removed for medical reasons, on his forearm), when Bob Paisley paid £110,000 for his services in July 1975. He made his debut on 16 August in a 2–0 league defeat to Queens Park Rangers at Loftus Road. He missed out on a league championship medal in 1975–76, as he did not play enough matches to qualify.

In 1977 left back Jones was part of the treble-chasing Liverpool team which won the League championship and reached the finals of the FA Cup and European Cup.  Jones scored his first goal for the club on 9 November 1976 in the 5–1 league thrashing of Leicester City at Anfield. The treble, unprecedented in English football, was not forthcoming. Liverpool lost 2–1 in the FA Cup final at Wembley to Manchester United, though Jones supplied the accurate long pass for Jimmy Case to score Liverpool's goal. However, Jones became the first Welshman to receive a European Cup winners medal when Liverpool won their first European Cup in Rome four days later, defeating Borussia Mönchengladbach 3–1. A memorable banner was unfurled by Liverpool supporters at the European Cup final in Rome which said "Joey Ate The Frogs Legs, Made The Swiss Roll, Now He's Munching Gladbach".

Jones was in and out of the side the following year, with the renaissance of Tommy Smith and the emergence of young Scottish defender Alan Hansen severely reducing his first team opportunities. He left in the summer of 1978 after exactly 100 appearances, in which he scored 3 goals.

Return to Wrexham
He returned to Wrexham in 1978 for £210,000, a record that stood as Wrexham's record signing until the £300,000 signing of Ollie Palmer in January 2022.

Chelsea
In 1982, Jones joined Chelsea for £34,000, having been signed by John Neal. Jones was sent off on his debut against Carlisle United at Brunton Park. However, Jones's committed attitude and pre-match fist-clenching ritual eventually made him a cult hero among the fans. He also proved instrumental in Chelsea's successful battle to avoid relegation to the Third Division. He was a part of the side which romped to promotion as Second Division champions in 1983–84. He remained with the club in the top flight for one more season, before surprisingly being sold to Huddersfield Town for £35,000 in August 1985. He finished his Chelsea career with 78 league appearances and 2 goals.

Huddersfield and third spell at Wrexham
He joined Huddersfield in the summer of 1985 from Chelsea, and was named Town's player of the year in his first season. After two seasons he left to re-join Wrexham, where he retired at the end of the 1991–92 season.

International career
Joey made his Wales debut in November 1975 against Austria. He went on to win 72 caps, scoring one goal, his last action coming in a friendly away to Canada in May 1986.

After retirement

Jones underwent heart surgery in 2002 and has since scaled down his commitments with Wrexham, he works as the Under 18's and Reserve team coach. In 2001, he had a brief spell as caretaker manager between the departure of Brian Flynn and arrival of Denis Smith.

In 2005, Jones completed his autobiography entitled "Oh Joey, Joey!" about his life in football. This was a book of the week on Sky Sports News in February 2006.

Also in 2005, Jones was named as Wrexham's ultimate Cult Hero on BBC TV's Football Focus. Jones is much respected by Liverpool supporters and he finished in 63rd place in the 2006 poll of all-time favourite Liverpool players (100 Players Who Shook The Kop). 110,000 fans worldwide had taken part in the vote.

Honours
Wrexham
Welsh Cup: 1974–75

Liverpool
Football League First Division: 1976–77
European Cup: 1976–77, 1977–78
UEFA Cup: 1975–76
UEFA Super Cup: 1977

Chelsea
Football League Second Division: 1983–84

Individual
PFA Team of the Year: 1988–89 Fourth Division

References

External links
 Hall of fame at http://world.wrexhamafc.co.uk
 Happy Faces Children's Charity Patron

1955 births
Living people
Welsh footballers
Wales international footballers
Wales under-23 international footballers
Wrexham A.F.C. players
Wrexham A.F.C. managers
Welsh football managers
Liverpool F.C. players
Chelsea F.C. players
Huddersfield Town A.F.C. players
English Football League players
People from Llandudno
Sportspeople from Conwy County Borough
Association football defenders
UEFA Champions League winning players
UEFA Cup winning players
FA Cup Final players